Michael Eskesen (born June 5, 1986) is a Danish professional ice hockey defenceman who currently plays for the Odense Bulldogs of the Metal Ligaen.

Eskesen played for the Danish national team at the 2011 IIHF World Championship.

External links

1986 births
Danish ice hockey defencemen
Living people
Odense Bulldogs players
Rødovre Mighty Bulls players
SønderjyskE Ishockey players
Stjernen Hockey players
Sportspeople from Odense